Erikoussa is an island and a former community of the Ionian Islands, Greece. It is one of the Diapontian Islands; an island complex to the northwest of Corfu. Since the 2019 local government reform it is part of the municipality of Central Corfu and Diapontian Islands, of which it is a municipal unit. It is located off the northwestern coast of the island of Corfu, and is almost equidistant from Corfu to the southeast, Mathraki to the southwest, and Othonoi to the west. The municipal unit has an area of 4.449 km2. It has six settlements; the main one is Porto (Πόρτο), which is also where the only port is located. The island has dense vegetation and three beaches; Porto (Πόρτο), Bragini (Μπραγκίνι), and Fiki (Φύκι). The name Ereikoussa derives from the plant ereíki (ερείκη), which can be found throughout the island.

References

Populated places in Corfu (regional unit)
Islands of Greece
Islands of the Ionian Islands (region)
Landforms of Corfu (regional unit)